The Huia River is a river of New Zealand's South Island West Coast. It flows north to meet with the Kakapo River two kilometres before the latter flows into the Karamea River, 17 kilometres to the east of Karamea.

See also
List of rivers of New Zealand

References

Rivers of the West Coast, New Zealand
Buller District
Rivers of New Zealand